Ouse (pronounced - ooze) is a locality and small town in the Central Highlands Council local government area in Tasmania, Australia on the Lyell Highway. At the 2016 census, Ouse had a population of 303.

History
Ouse is the settlement where convicts James Goodwin and Thomas Connolly broke out of the South West Wilderness four weeks after their escape from Sarah Island. Ouse Post Office opened on 1 October 1835.

The town briefly made national headlines in August 2006 when the Ouse District Hospital, originally established as a Bush Nursing Centre and reconstituted in its present form in 1956, was downgraded to a community health centre.

Education
Ouse District School is a public school which caters for students from Kindergarten to grade 6.

Climate
Ouse has a dry oceanic climate (Cfb), with warm, dry summers and cool, somewhat damp winters. The diurnal ranges are rather high throughout the year, due to the inland location. Rainfall is erratic and variable, but is generally highest in early spring and lowest in midsummer. Frost is very common in the winter, in addition to it being recorded all year-round, even in the summer. Snowfall is not uncommon but sporadic due to the foehn effect.

References

External links
 Ouse - Community History

Towns in Tasmania
Localities of Central Highlands Council